Berluti  is a prestigious leather maker that manufactures menswear, especially the leather finishing of calfskin, kangaroo leather and alligator skin in its production of shoes and boots. It makes leather belts, bags, and wallets, as well as bespoke and ready-to-wear garments. Established in 1895 by Italian Alessandro Berluti of Marche, Berluti is based in Paris on rue Marbeuf. The latest creative director was Kris Van Assche (2018-2021).

Creative Director
Alessandro Sartori was its artistic director for 5 years, ending his role in February 2016. Haider Ackermann was appointed the next current Creative Director; his first collection for the brand was Fall/Winter 2017 shown on 20 January 2017 at Paris Fashion Week. In March 2018, Ackermann exited. Kris Van Assche replaced Ackermann, with his first collection debuting in January 2019. On 21 April 2021, Kris Van Assche announced on his Instagram that his departure from the brand as its artistic director. He also said that during 3 years time in Berluti had been extremely intense especially in COVID-19 period.

History

 
Berluti was founded in 1895 by Italian Alessandro Berluti, and later run by Olga Squeri, also known as Olga Berluti. The LVMH group acquired Berluti in 1993. In 2012, Berluti acquired Paris tailor house Arnys and launched its first prêt-à-porter menswear collections.

Berluti is headed since 2012 by LVMH's CEO Bernard Arnault's son, Antoine Arnault, who also serves as the chairman of Loro Piana. In March 2014, Isabella Capece Galeota became director of image and communications.

In 2017 Business of Fashion named Berluti among the 16 best companies to work for in the fashion industry.

All the footwear manufacturing production is located in the town of Gaibanella in the municipality of Ferrara, while the quality control center at the corporate headquarters in Paris.

Clientele
Berluti patrons have included Pierre Bergé, Jean Cocteau, Alain Delon, Dean Martin, Matthew Scott-Young, Andy Warhol, Charles Aznavour, Frank Sinatra, Robert De Niro, Harvey Keitel, Yves Saint Laurent, Marcel Proust, Roman Polanski, and Timothée Chalamet.

References

External links

Berluti official website
Berluti, a luxury brand from LVMH Group
YouTube looks inside Berluti boutiques at NYC Madison Ave, Tokyo Ginza, Shanghai IFC

1895 establishments in France
Clothing brands of France
Comité Colbert members
Manufacturing companies based in Paris
Haute couture
High fashion brands
Luxury brands
LVMH brands
Shoe companies of France
Suit makers